In physics, the Weyl expansion, also known as the Weyl identity or angular spectrum expansion, expresses an outgoing spherical wave as a linear combination of plane waves. In a Cartesian coordinate system, it can be denoted as

,

.

The expansion is named after Hermann Weyl, who published it in 1919. The Weyl identity is largely used to characterize the reflection and transmission of spherical waves at planar interfaces; it is often used to derive the Green's functions for Helmholtz equation in layered media. The expansion also covers evanescent wave components. It is often preferred to the Sommerfeld identity when the field representation is needed to be in Cartesian coordinates. 

The resulting Weyl integral is commonly encountered in microwave integrated circuit analysis and electromagnetic radiation over a stratified medium; as in the case for Sommerfeld integral, it is numerically evaluated. As a result, it is used in calculation of Green's functions for method of moments for such geometries. Other uses include the descriptions of dipolar emissions near surfaces in nanophotonics, holographic inverse scattering problems, Green's functions in quantum electrodynamics and acoustic or seismic waves.

See also
 Angular spectrum method
 Fourier optics
 Green's function
 Plane wave expansion
 Sommerfeld identity

References

Sources
 
 
 
 

Mathematical identities
Mathematical physics
Electrodynamics
Wave mechanics